"The Sun Ain't Gonna Shine (Anymore)" is a song written by Bob Crewe and Bob Gaudio.

It was originally released as a single credited to Frankie Valli as a solo artist in 1965 on the Smash label, but was more successful when recorded by the Walker Brothers in 1966. Cher, Keane, and Bruce Springsteen have also recorded the song.

Frankie Valli recorded and released the first version of the song but his single achieved only limited success, charting on Billboards Bubbling Under Hot 100 singles chart but not making the Billboard Hot 100 itself (#128). Although it was recorded in a Four Seasons recording session (with the other band members at that time), it was Valli's first official "solo" single since the 1950s.

The Walker Brothers version

In 1966, the Walker Brothers released their remake as a single. Re-titled "The Sun Ain't Gonna Shine Anymore", this version met with much greater success than Valli's. It topped the UK Singles Chart, and also became their highest-charting song on the Billboard Hot 100 chart in the U.S., where it peaked at #13.  The single also hit the top 10 in Canada, Ireland, Germany, the Netherlands, New Zealand and Norway.

The Walker Brothers' recording has since garnered retrospective critical acclaim, and is considered the group's signature song. NME ranked the song at #357 on its list of the "500 Greatest Songs of All Time", Pitchfork ranked it at #187 on its list of "The 200 Best Songs of the 1960s", and it is listed in the 2010 book 1001 Songs You Must Hear Before You Die.

Usage in media
In 2010, this version was used in the promotional trailer for the AMC television series The Walking Dead.

In 2012, the Walker Brothers' rendition played a prominent role in the film Seeking a Friend for the End of the World. It was featured the following year in the film Stoker.

In 2013, the single's B-side, "After the Lights Go Out" played over the end-credits of the Canadian-Spanish psychological thriller film Enemy.

In 2018, the Hulu streaming service series Castle Rock used the Walker Brothers' recording in season 1, episode 6.

Track listing

Chart positions

Cher version

In the summer of 1996, Cher released her remake as the fourth official European single from her twenty-second album It's a Man's World. The song went to #26 on the UK Singles Chart. Her version was used in The X-Files episode "The Post-Modern Prometheus".

Critical reception
Allmusic called this song "a real highlight" and added: "epic and beautiful, complete with echoes of the Wild West."

Track listing
UK cassette single
"The Sun Ain't Gonna Shine Anymore" (Trevor Horn Remix) – 4:02
"Not Enough Love in the World" (Sam Ward Remix) – 4:21

UK CD single
"The Sun Ain't Gonna Shine Anymore" (Trevor Horn Remix) – 4:02
"Not Enough Love in the World" (Sam Ward Remix) – 4:21
"Paradise Is Here" (Album Version) – 5:04

UK 12" single
"The Sun Ain't Gonna Shine Anymore" (Alternative Mix) – 4:02
"Not Enough Love in the World" (Sam Ward Remix) – 4:21
"Paradise Is Here" (Sam Ward US Mix) – 4:40

Charts

Keane version

In 2004, British band Keane recorded the song. Deviating from the original, Tim Rice-Oxley, pianist and composer of Keane, changed the guitar for piano. He also took the lead vocals in the second chorus, like the original version. The single was selected in summer 2004 by readers of the NME and first released as a download-only single in September 2004. It was given for download to the War Child foundation website and one thousand vinyl copies given as a gift to some fans of Keane, who had supported and helped the band. The numbered copies each included a handwritten note from Tim Rice-Oxley, also signed by the other two members, thanking them for their support.

Track listing
"The Sun Ain't Gonna Shine Anymore"
"Your Eyes Open" (Mo Mental Remix)

Other versions
 The Ormsby Brothers, in 1974 - peaking at #93 in Australia. 
 In 1981, Nielsen/Pearson released their remake as a single. It became their last Hot 100 hit, peaking at #56.
 Russell Hitchcock, the lead vocalist of Air Supply, for his eponymous 1988 solo debut album.
 Neil Diamond included it in the 9th track of the 1989 LP album September Morn with Bob Gaudio at the piano.
 The song features prominently in the 1991 bittersweet romance film Truly, Madly, Deeply, starring Alan Rickman and Juliet Stevenson, with Nina (Stevenson) playing the main chords in the chorus on the piano and Jamie (Rickman) playing the main riff on the bass strings of his cello, and both of them singing.  Singing the song is a game the couple often played.
Bruce Springsteen recorded the song for his 2022 album, Only the Strong Survive.
Jules Shear included a version on his 1994 album "The Healing Bones".

References

1965 songs
1965 singles
1966 singles
1981 singles
1996 singles
2004 singles
Songs written by Bob Crewe
Songs written by Bob Gaudio
Frankie Valli songs
The Four Seasons (band) songs
The Walker Brothers songs
Cher songs
Keane (band) songs
Jay and the Americans songs
Neil Diamond songs
The Lettermen songs
Russell Hitchcock songs
Song recordings produced by Bob Crewe
UK Singles Chart number-one singles
Smash Records singles
Philips Records singles
Warner Music Group singles
Song recordings produced by Ivor Raymonde
Articles containing video clips
Song recordings with Wall of Sound arrangements